Brian Richard Tufano  (1 December 1939 – 12 January 2023) was an English cinematographer, best known for his work on the films of Danny Boyle and Menhaj Huda. Tufano was admitted to the British Society of Cinematographers and won the 2001 BAFTA Award for Outstanding Contribution to Film and Television. His most well-known works include Trainspotting, A Life Less Ordinary and Billy Elliot.

Life and career
Tufano began his career at the BBC as a projectionist, working his way up to become a cameraman with the BBC film department in 1963. During his time at the BBC, Tufano worked with directors including Stephen Frears and Alan Parker. In 1992 he was assigned to the series Mr. Wroe's Virgins and worked with director Danny Boyle.

Tufano went freelance in the mid-1970s - his first feature was the 1978 film The Sailor's Return with director Jack Gold.

During the 1980s, Tufano spent time working in the United States, including additional cinematography for Jordan Cronenweth on Blade Runner.

Boyle worked with Tufano on his feature debut, Shallow Grave, and continued to work with Tufano on the 1996 films Trainspotting and the 1997 film A Life Less Ordinary. Boyle and Tufano also worked together on the 2008 short film Alien Love Triangle.

Tufano worked with director Menhaj Huda on his first feature film, Jump Boy, in 1999, and they went on to work together on the 2006 feature film Kidulthood. Tufano also shot the 2008 sequel Adulthood, which was directed by Noel Clarke. Huda and Tufano worked together on the 2011 feature, Everywhere and Nowhere.

From 2003 to 2016, Tufano was Head of Cinematography at the National Film and Television School in Beaconsfield. Before his passing, he was a Teaching Fellow at the school.

Tufano died on 12 January 2023, at the age of 83.

Awards and nominations
For his work on Late Night Shopping, Tufano was nominated for the Technical Achievement Award at the Evening Standard British Film Awards.

Tufano won the Special Jury Prize at the 2002 British Independent Film Awards. Tufano received the BSC ARRI John Alcott Memorial Award in 2015, and went on to receive the British Society of Cinematographers Lifetime Achievement Award in 2020.

BAFTA Awards

Filmography

References

External links 

1939 births
2023 deaths
BAFTA winners (people)
British cinematographers
English people of Italian descent
People from Shepherd's Bush